Sisamnes is a genus of dirt-colored seed bugs in the family Rhyparochromidae. There are at least four described species in Sisamnes.

Species
These four species belong to the genus Sisamnes:
 Sisamnes annulicollis (Berg, C., 1894) c g
 Sisamnes claviger (Uhler, 1895) i g b
 Sisamnes clavigerus (Uhler, 1895) c g
 Sisamnes contractus Distant, 1893 i c g b
Data sources: i = ITIS, c = Catalogue of Life, g = GBIF, b = Bugguide.net

References

Rhyparochromidae
Articles created by Qbugbot